Pierre Jérôme Honoré Daumet (October 23, 1826 – December 12, 1911) was a French architect.

Biography
A student at the Beaux-Arts de Paris under Guillaume Abel Blouet, Charles-Félix Saint-Père and Émile Gilbert, he won the Grand Prix de Rome for architecture in 1855. Daumet accompanied the Archeologist Léon Heuzey on an expedition to Macedonia in 1861. On his return he married the daughter of the architect Charles Questel.

Daumet founded his own atelier which would produce nine further Grand Prix winners, Charles-Louis Girault chief among them, and attracted a number of foreign students such as Charles McKim and Austin W. Lord.  

In 1908, Daumet won the Royal Gold Medal of the Royal Institute of British Architects.

He was a close friend of the sculptor Henri Chapu. Daumet died on December 12, 1911, at his home in the 6th arrondissement of Paris, and was buried in the 15th division of Montparnasse Cemetery.

Works
 Extension and western front of the Palais de Justice in Paris (1857–1868) with Joseph-Louis Duc
 Reconstruction of the Château de Chantilly (1875-1882) for Henri d'Orléans, Duke of Aumale.
 Basilica of Sacré Coeur (1884-1886). Daumet was the first of five successive architects who completed the building after the death of Paul Abadie. He was followed by Charles Laisné in 1886.
 Grenoble, Palais de Justice, Palais des Facultés
 Restoration of the Villa Tiburtine
 Construction of the boarding school of Sion in Tunis
 Grandstands of the Chantilly Racecourse (1879)
 Restoration of the Roman theatre of Orange
 Restoration of Château de Saint-Germain-en-Laye
 Restoration of the chapel of the Palace of Versailles

References 

This article is based on the equivalent article from the French Wikipedia, consulted on June 7, 2008.

Architects from Paris
1826 births
1911 deaths
19th-century French architects
20th-century French architects
Prix de Rome for architecture
Recipients of the Royal Gold Medal
École des Beaux-Arts alumni
Members of the Académie des beaux-arts
Members of the French School at Athens